In this page, there is the list of the Canadian number-one albums of 1969. The chart is compiled and published by RPM every Monday (except from August 2, when the chart is published every Saturday).

References

See also
1969 in music
RPM number-one hits of 1969

1969
1969 in Canadian music
Canada Albums